Manganese(II) bromide is the chemical compound composed of manganese and bromine with the formula MnBr2.

It can be used in place of palladium in the Stille reaction, which couples two carbon atoms using an organotin compound.

References

Manganese(II) compounds
Bromides
Metal halides